John Denis Bray (11 January 1916 – 13 January 1982) was an  Australian rules footballer who played with St Kilda in the Victorian Football League (VFL).

Family
The son of Joseph Michael Bray (1888–1955), and Mary Helena Bray (1886–1971), née Murphy, John Denis Bray was born at Malvern, Victoria on 11 January 1916.

He married Elizabeth Mary Persia Gladys Coram (1909–2004), known as Gladys, on 5 August 1939. They had five children, John, Judith, Sherrill, Lorraine, and Peter.

Football

Ormond (VAFA)
He began his senior football with the Ormond Amateur Football Club in the Victorian Amateur Football Association (VAFA) in 1935. He was Ormond's captain in 1937, 1938, and 1939.

St Kilda (VFL)
Having tried out with Richmond in 1937, he went to St Kilda in 1940. With no chance of playing in the finals, and preparing for the next season, St Kilda used the last games of the 1940 season to give several of its best Seconds players senior experience. Promoted from the Seconds, he played in the last three home-and-away matches of the 1940 season for St Kilda: along with Marcus Hines, Bray's first senior game was against North Melbourne, at Arden Street, on 27 July 1940. 

In his final match of the 1940 season, against Carlton, at Prices Park, on 17 August 1940, he was involved in a fierce confrontation in the third quarter. Bray was reported for striking Carlton's Jack Hale, and Carlton's Ron Savage was reported for charging Bray. Both players were found guilty, and were disqualified for four matches. Having served his suspension, he played in each of the 14 remaining home-and-away matches in the 1941 season.

Ormond (VAFA)
In 1946, when the VAFA competition had resumed from its five-year wartime suspension, Bray was once again playing for Ormond. He retired at the end of the 1947 season, having played almost 150 VAFA games with Ormond.

Military service
He enlisted in the Second AIF on 1 September 1942, and was discharged on 28 November 1945.

Death
He died (suddenly) while visiting family in Dunedin, New Zealand on 13 January 1982. He was buried at Green Park Cemetery, Waldronville, New Zealand.

Notes

References
 World War Two Nominal Roll: Lance Bombadier John Denis Bray (VX102523), Department of Veterans' Affairs.
 World War Two Service Record: Lance Bombadier John Denis Bray (VX102523), National Archives of Australia.
 de Lacy, H.A., "South Australians Win Army Football: Victorian Unit Outplayed", The Sporting Globe, (Wednesday, 7 October 1942), p.15.

External links 

1916 births
1982 deaths
Australian rules footballers from Melbourne
St Kilda Football Club players
Ormond Amateur Football Club players
Australian Army personnel of World War II
Australian Army soldiers
Burials at Green Park Cemetery
People from Malvern, Victoria
Military personnel from Melbourne